Kristine Monic Reeves (born February 18, 1981) is an American politician who serves as a member of the Washington House of Representatives from the 30th district. She was initially elected in 2016 but resigned before finishing her term to run for Washington's 10th congressional district in the 2020 election; she ultimately placed third in the blanket primary. In 2022 she ran for her previously-held state legislative seat when her appointed successor chose not to seek re-election.  She is a member of the Democratic Party.

Early life and education 
Reeves was born in Moses Lake, Washington. She earned a Bachelor of Arts in political science from Washington State University and Master of Arts in organizational leadership from Gonzaga University.

Career 
Reeves is also a former regional outreach director for United States Senator Patty Murray, as well as a program coordinator for Spokane Community College. Since 2013, Reeves has worked as Director of the Military and Defense Sector within the Washington State Department of Commerce.

Reeves ran for the Washington State House in 2016, defeating Republican Teri Hickel with 51 percent of the vote. Reeves was a member of the Capital Budget and Community Development, Housing and Tribal Affairs, as well as the vice chair of the Business and Financial Services Committee.

Reeves announced on December 16, 2019 that she would be resigning her seat in the state house effective at noon that same day. Her announcement and an e-mail from her political consultant led some to believe she would be running for Washington's 10th congressional district in the 2020 election. She formally announced her campaign on January 6, 2020. Reeves finished in third place, behind former Tacoma mayor Marilyn Strickland and State Rep. Beth Doglio.

Reeves is Executive Director of the Washington Military Alliance. As Director of Economic Development for the Military and Defense sector, she focuses on economic development relating to military infrastructure, suppliers and contractors, as well as community advocacy and public infrastructure organizations.

Personal life 
Reeves lives in Federal Way, Washington with her family, including two children.

References

External links 
Campaign website

1981 births
African-American state legislators in Washington (state)
Living people
Democratic Party members of the Washington House of Representatives
20th-century African-American people
Women state legislators in Washington (state)